Khalil Mohammed Allawi (born 6 September 1958) is an Iraqi football defender who played for Iraq in the 1986 FIFA World Cup. He also played for Al-Rasheed Club.

Career statistics

International goals
Scores and results list Iraq's goal tally first.

References

External links

1958 births
Iraqi footballers
Iraq international footballers
Association football defenders
Al-Karkh SC players
1986 FIFA World Cup players
Living people
Olympic footballers of Iraq
Footballers at the 1984 Summer Olympics
Asian Games medalists in football
Footballers at the 1982 Asian Games
Al-Shorta SC players
Asian Games gold medalists for Iraq
Medalists at the 1982 Asian Games